The 2021 Sparkassen Open was a professional tennis tournament played on clay courts. It was the 27th edition of the tournament which was part of the 2021 ATP Challenger Tour. It took place in Braunschweig, Germany between 5 and 11 July 2021.

Singles main-draw entrants

Seeds

 1 Rankings are as of 28 June 2021.

Other entrants
The following players received wildcards into the singles main draw:
  Rudolf Molleker
  Marvin Möller
  Benoît Paire

The following players received entry into the singles main draw as alternates:
  Malek Jaziri
  Mischa Zverev

The following players received entry from the qualifying draw:
  Sandro Ehrat
  Dayne Kelly
  Daniel Michalski
  Mats Rosenkranz

The following player received entry as a lucky loser:
  Benjamin Hassan

Champions

Singles

  Daniel Altmaier def.  Henri Laaksonen 6–1, 6–2.

Doubles

  Szymon Walków /  Jan Zieliński def.  Ivan Sabanov /  Matej Sabanov 6–4, 4–6, [10–4].

References

2021 ATP Challenger Tour
2021
2021 in German tennis
July 2021 sports events in Germany